Gekko smithii, commonly known as Smith's green-eyed gecko or the large forest gecko, is a species of lizard in the family Gekkonidae. The species is native to mainland Southeast Asia and Indonesia.

Description

Etymology
The specific name, smithii, is in honor of Scottish zoologist Andrew Smith (1797–1872), who was the founder of the South African Museum.

Similar species
Species of similar appearance include Gekko taylori and Gekko gecko, as well as Gekko verreauxii (from the Andaman and Nicobar Islands) and Gekko siamensis (from central Thailand).

Geographic range
G. smithii is found in southern Thailand (Satun, Narathiwatk Pattani), Singapore, western Malaysia (Pulau Pinang, Perak, Pahang, Selangor, Pulau Tioman), Myanmar (Burma), India (Nicobar Islands), and Indonesia (Borneo, Sumatra, Pulau Nias, Java).

The type locality is "Prince of Wales' Island" (= Pulau Pinang, West Malaysia).

Habitat
The preferred natural habitat of G. smithii is forest.

Diet
G. smithii preys on insects, especially grasshoppers.

Reproduction
The sexually mature female G. smithii lays a clutch of two eggs. The eggs are almost spherical, the average egg measuring 20 x 19 mm (0.79 x 0.75 in).

References

Further reading
Boulenger GA (1885). Catalogue of the Lizards in the British Museum (Natural History). Second Edition. Volume I. Geckonidæ, Eublepharidæ, Uroplatidæ, Pygopodidæ, Agamidæ. London: Trustees of the British Museum (Natural History). (Taylor and Francis, printers). xii + 436 pp. + Plates I-XXXII. (Gecko stentor, pp. 184–185).
Gray JE (1842). "Description of some new species of Reptiles, chiefly from the British Museum collection". The Zoological Miscellany 2: 57–59. (Gecko smithii, new species, p. 57).
Grossmann W (2004). "Gekko smithii Gray 1842". Sauria Supplement 26 (3): 627–634.
Rösler H (2001). "Studien am Tokeh: 1. Gekko gecko azhari Mertens 1955 (Sauria: Gekkonidae)". Gekkota 3: 33–46.
Smith MA (1935). The Fauna of British India, Including Ceylon and Burma. Reptilia and Amphibia. Vol. II.—Sauria. London: Secretary of State for India in Council. (Taylor and Francis, printers). xiii + 440 pp. + Plate I + 2 maps. (Gekko smithi, p. 113).

External links

https://web.archive.org/web/20040302104359/http://www.xs4all.nl/~reptilia/Images/Gekko%20smithi.jpg

smithii
Fauna of Sumatra
Reptiles of Myanmar
Geckos of Thailand
Reptiles described in 1842
Taxa named by John Edward Gray
Reptiles of Borneo